Javiera Paz Parada Ortiz (born 10 May 1974) is a Chilean politician.

In 2014, being already a member of Democratic Revolution (RD), Parada was appointed as cultural attaché of Chile in the US by the president Michelle Bachelet, who started her then second government (2014−2018).

Political career

Spell in RD and rupture
In 2012, she joined RD.

On 28 October 2019, Parada resigned to RD after the party's decision to impeach to the President Sebastián Piñera.

Collaboration with Piñera
In 2021, her NGO 'Corporación Libertad y Comunicaciones' («Liberty and Communications Corporation») received direct support from Piñera's government to support the goals of the organization towards the then-future Constitutional Convention.

References

External links
 

1974 births
Living people
21st-century Chilean politicians
Communist Party of Chile politicians
Democratic Revolution politicians
Chilean former marxists